Paul C. McIntyre is an American Rick and Melinda Reed Professor, Department Chair in the Department of Materials Science and Engineering at Stanford University, and Senior Fellow at the Precourt Institute for Energy. He is well known for his research in atomic layer deposition for high-k dielectrics, semiconductor/oxide interfaces, and thin film applications. He received his Sc.D. from MIT in 1993. He has won the IBM Faculty Award and was a Charles Lee Powell Foundation Scholar.

References

External links

McIntyre Research Group Website

American nanotechnologists
Massachusetts Institute of Technology alumni
Living people
Year of birth missing (living people)
Stanford University School of Engineering faculty